Serafino is the title character of an Italian comic series created by Egidio Gherlizza.

The character originally debuted in 1948 as a kangaroo, but was redesigned as a more canine looking character in 1952. The comics series was originally published in the comics magazine Cucciolo, as a filler intended for the younger readers. It also named a short-lived eponym comic book series, published in Italy by Edizioni Alpe.

The comics feature an unlucky and always hungry tramp, initially portrayed as kangaroo and that over the years assumed more human appearances.

References 

Italian comics titles
Italian comics characters
Comics characters introduced in 1952
1952 comics debuts
Humor comics
Fictional kangaroos and wallabies
Fictional beggars
Fictional hoboes